The Bantu Investment Corporation Act, Act No 34 of 1959, formed part of the apartheid system of racial segregation in South Africa. In combination with the Bantu Homelands Development Act of 1965, it allowed the South African government to capitalize on entrepreneurs operating in the Bantustans. It created a Development Corporation in each of the Bantustans.

References

Apartheid laws in South Africa
1959 in South African law